The 2008 season of the Polish American Football League (PLFA I) was the 3rd season played by the major american football league in Poland. Regular season play was held from March 29 to September 28, 2008. The Polish champion title was eventually won by the Warsaw Eagles when they defeated the Pomorze Seahawks; the Polish Bowl championship game, at the Olympic Stadium in Wrocław, Lower Silesian Voivodeship on October 18.

Regular season

Playoffs 
Top four teams was qualify to the play-offs.

Bracket

Semi-finals 
 October 4, Warsaw
 Eagles vs. The Crew 8:7
 October 5, Gdańsk
 Seahawks vs. Devils 24:20

Polish Bowl III 
 October 18, 2008
 Wrocław
 Olympic Stadium
 Attendance: 800
 MVP: Wojciech Krzemień (Eagles)

See also 
 2008 in sports

References

External links 
 Polish American Football Association

Polish American Football League seasons
Poland
Plfa Season, 2008